County Route 525 (CR 525) is a county highway in the U.S. state of New Jersey. The highway extends  from Union Avenue (Route 28) in Bound Brook to Main Street (CR 510) in Mendham Borough.

CR 525 begins with a couple of turns through Chimney Rock and Martinsville. From Interstate 78 to the northern terminus, CR 525 is mostly a two lane undivided road with some sections multilaned. From Interstate 287 to the northern terminus, CR 525 has a solid northwest alignment.

Route description 

CR 525 begins as Thompson Avenue, approaching the village of Chimney Rock. In Chimney Rock, CR 525 meets U.S. Route 22, currently divided into two carriageways.

North of US 22, CR 525 continues its northern course through Chimney Rock and has a couple of wide turns. CR 525 enters Martinsville from the south as Chimney Rock Road. In Martinsville, CR 525 turns west on to  Washington Valley Road before turning north onto Mount Horeb Road. Upon exiting Martinsville, CR 525 becomes Liberty Corner Road. Now in Bernards Township, CR 525 intersects Interstate 78 at exit 33.

Briefly north of I-78, CR 525 is named Martinsville Road upon entering Liberty Corner. In Liberty Corner, CR 525 intersects County Route 512 while becoming Mount Airy Road. North of Liberty Corner, CR 525 changes its alignment to a northwest course while meeting with Interstate 287 at exit 26. Then, CR 525 changes to a more northerly alignment. In Bernardsville, CR 525 intersects U.S. Route 202. CR 525 briefly forms a concurry with Route 202 before becoming Claremont Road north of Route 202. CR 525 then changes its name to Mendham Road while changing its course to the northwest in the process.

CR 525 enters Morris County as Bernardsville Road. CR 525 enters the borough of Mendham with a couple of wide turns before terminating at an intersection with County Route 510.

History 
Two spur routes of County Route 525 formerly existed. The first County Route 525 Spur ran along what is now Somerset County Route 640. The second County Route 525 Spur ran along what is now Somerset County Route 620.

Major intersections

See also

References

External links 

NJ State Highways: CR 515-530

525
525
525